A vertisol, or vertosol,  is a soil type in which there is a high content of expansive clay minerals, many of them known as montmorillonite, that form deep cracks in drier seasons or years. In a phenomenon known as argillipedoturbation, alternate shrinking and swelling causes self-ploughing, where the soil material consistently mixes itself, causing some vertisols to have an extremely deep A horizon and no B horizon. (A soil with no B horizon is called an A/C soil). This heaving of the underlying material to the surface often creates a microrelief known as gilgai.

Vertisols typically form from highly basic rocks, such as basalt, in climates that are seasonally humid or subject to erratic droughts and floods, or that impeded drainage. Depending on the parent material and the climate, they can range from grey or red to the more familiar deep black (known as "black earths" in Australia, "black gumbo" in East Texas, "black cotton" soils in East Africa, and "vlei soils" in South Africa).

Vertisols are found between 50°N and 45°S of the equator.  Major areas where vertisols are dominant are eastern Australia (especially inland Queensland and New South Wales), the Deccan Plateau of India, and parts of southern Sudan, Ethiopia, Kenya, Chad (the Gezira), South Africa, and the lower Paraná River in South America. Other areas where vertisols are dominant include southern Texas and adjacent Mexico, central India, northeast Nigeria, Thrace, New Caledonia and parts of eastern China.

The natural vegetation of vertisols is grassland, savanna, or grassy woodland. The heavy texture and unstable behaviour of the soil makes it difficult for many tree species to grow, and forest is uncommon.

The shrinking and swelling of vertisols can damage buildings and roads, leading to extensive subsidence. Vertisols are generally used for grazing of cattle or sheep. It is not unknown for livestock to be injured through falling into cracks in dry periods. Conversely, many wild and domestic ungulates do not like to move on this soil when inundated.  However, the shrink-swell activity allows rapid recovery from compaction.

When irrigation is available, crops such as cotton, wheat, sorghum and rice can be grown. Vertisols are especially suitable for rice because they are almost impermeable when saturated. Rainfed farming is very difficult because vertisols can be worked only under a very narrow range of moisture conditions: they are very hard when dry and very sticky when wet. However, in Australia, vertisols are highly regarded, because they are among the few soils that are not acutely deficient in available phosphorus. Some, known as "crusty vertisols", have a thin, hard crust when dry that can persist for two to three years before they have crumbled enough to permit seeding.

In the USA soil taxonomy, vertisols are subdivided into:
 Aquerts: Vertisols which are subdued aquic conditions for some time in most years and show redoximorphic features are grouped as Aquerts. Because of the high clay content, the permeability is slowed and aquic conditions are likely to occur. In general, when precipitation exceeds evapotranspiration, ponding may occur. Under wet soil moisture conditions, iron and manganese are mobilized and reduced. The manganese may be partly responsible for the dark color of the soil profile.
 Cryerts: They have a cryic soil temperature regime. Cryerts are most extensive in the grassland and forest-grassland transitions zones of the Canadian Prairies and at similar latitudes in Russia.
 Xererts: They have a thermic, mesic, or frigid soil temperature regime. They show cracks that are open at least 60 consecutive days during the summer, but are closed at least 60 consecutive days during winter. Xererts are most extensive in the eastern Mediterranean and parts of California.
 Torrerts: They have cracks that are closed for less than 60 consecutive days when the soil temperature at 50 cm is above 8 °C. These soils are not extensive in the U.S., and occur mostly in west Texas, New Mexico, Arizona, and South Dakota, but are the most extensive suborder of vertisols in Australia.
 Usterts: They have cracks that are open for at least 90 cumulative days per year. Globally, this suborder is the most extensive of the vertisols order, encompassing the vertisols of the tropics and monsoonal climates in Australia, India, and Africa. In the U.S. the Usterts are common in Texas, Montana, Hawaii, and California.
 Uderts: They have cracks that are open less than 90 cumulative days per year and less than 60 consecutive days during the summer. In some areas, cracks open only in drought years. Uderts are of small extent globally, being most abundant in Uruguay and eastern Argentina, but also found in parts of Queensland and the "Black Belt" of Mississippi and Alabama.

See also
Pedogenesis
Pedology (soil study)
Soil classification

References 

 IUSS Working Group WRB: World Reference Base for Soil Resources, fourth edition. International Union of Soil Sciences, Vienna 2022. .
 Soil Survey Staff: Keys to Soil Taxonomy. 12th edition. Natural Resources Conservation Service. U.S. Department of Agriculture. Washington D.C., USA, 2014.

Further reading
 W. Zech, P. Schad, G. Hintermaier-Erhard: Soils of the World. Springer, Berlin 2022, Chapter 9.3.3.

External links 
 profile photos (with classification) WRB homepage
 profile photos (with classification) IUSS World of Soils

Pedology
Types of soil
Patterned grounds